Anne Kreuzberg (born 29 October 1963) is a German former footballer who played as a midfielder. She made ten appearances for the Germany national team from 1984 to 1985.

References

External links
 

1963 births
Living people
German women's footballers
Women's association football midfielders
Germany women's international footballers
Place of birth missing (living people)